The Sky Rider is a 1928 American silent drama film directed by Alan James and starring Gareth Hughes and Josephine Hill.

Cast
 Champion the Dog as Champion
 Gareth Hughes as Dick
 Josephine Hill as Alice Allan
 J.P. Lockney as John Wilson
 John Tansey as Joseph
 Lew Meehan as Mike Slaney
 Sheldon Lewis as Doc Shade
 Aline Goodwin as Mrs. Shade

References

Bibliography
 Michael R. Pitts. Poverty Row Studios, 1929-1940: An Illustrated History of 55 Independent Film Companies, with a Filmography for Each. McFarland & Company, 2005.

External links

1928 films
1928 drama films
Silent American drama films
Films directed by Alan James
American silent feature films
1920s English-language films
Chesterfield Pictures films
American black-and-white films
1920s American films